USS Paramount (AMc-92) was an Accentor-class coastal minesweeper acquired by the U.S. Navy for the dangerous task of removing mines from minefields laid in the water to prevent ships from passing.

Paramount was laid down 14 April 1941 by the Delaware Bay SB Co., Inc. Leesburg, New Jersey; launched 9 August 1941; and placed in service 31 December 1941.

World War II service 

Paramount spent her entire Naval career participating in exercises and making voyages along the Atlantic Coast of the Southern U.S. and in the Caribbean. Involved in a grounding at the entrance to Ocracoke Inlet on 19 February 1942, she was towed to Morehead City, North Carolina by USCG Cutter Dione, in sinking condition, for repairs. Placed out of service on 8 February 1946, Paramount was struck from the Naval Vessel Register 26 February and was transferred to the Maritime Commission for disposal on 16 September.

References

External links 
 NavSource Online: Mine Warfare Vessel Photo Archive - Paramount (AMc 92)

 

Accentor-class minesweepers
Ships built in Leesburg, New Jersey
1941 ships
World War II minesweepers of the United States
Maritime incidents in February 1942